Khalid Jalal (Arabic:خالد جلال) (born 5 April 1991) is an Emirati footballer. He currently plays as a midfielder for Al Nasr.

External links

References

Emirati footballers
1991 births
Living people
Al Wahda FC players
Al-Nasr SC (Dubai) players
Khor Fakkan Sports Club players
UAE Pro League players
Association football midfielders